Ovis orientalis (a species of wild sheep, Ovis) may refer to:

 the Ovis orientalis orientalis subspecies group, commonly known as mouflon,
 the Ovis orientalis vignei subspecies group, commonly known as urial.

Ovis